Alin Artimon (born 31 August 1971 in Timișoara, Romania) is a former Romanian football player and current manager.

Artimon started his career at CSȘ Timișoara and played for the senior team of Politehnica Timișoara before joining Steaua București. He was labeled the next Miodrag Belodedici, but he was plagued by injuries and never really managed to progress. His subsequent career saw him play for Timișoara based teams, such as CFR and Poli, before moving on to FC Onești and ending his career at Drobeta-Turnu Severin.

He started his manager career at the Divizia C team Telecom Timișoara. In 2004, he became the assistant of Gheorghe Mulțescu at Politehnica Timișoara and later on, in autumn 2004, the team's head coach. He continued his career as assistant and afterwards as head coach of Apulum Alba Iulia in Divizia A. After a short stint as manager at Bihor Oradea in Divizia B in 2005, Artimon was recruited in summer 2006 at Poli as a youth-supervisor. He received his big opportunity when being offered the manager position at the club after Sorin Cîrţu's release on 23 October 2006. While initially viewed only as a temporary solution, a good streak of results meant that he would be given the chance to lead the team for the remainder of the season.

However, on 5 March 2007, Artimon resigned from his position as manager, stating that he did not wish to continue to work for the club if his efforts remain unappreciated. The resignation came just two days after a draw against Dinamo București, when Poli used the second team in protest against a two-match ban received by Artavazd Karamyan. On 26 March 2007 he became the manager of the Divizia B team CFR Timișoara. In September 2008 he replaced Nikola Ilievski as manager at CSM Râmnicu Vâlcea. On 30 July 2010, Artimon followed Sebi Tudor as manager at Juventus București.

References

External links

1971 births
Living people
Sportspeople from Timișoara
Romanian footballers
FC Steaua București players
FC Politehnica Timișoara players
ACF Gloria Bistrița players
FC Drobeta-Turnu Severin players
FC CFR Timișoara players
Liga I players
Liga II players
Romanian football managers
FC Politehnica Timișoara managers
CSM Unirea Alba Iulia managers
FC Bihor Oradea managers
ASC Daco-Getica București managers
FCV Farul Constanța managers
Association football defenders